Batman is a village in the Tunceli District, Tunceli Province, Turkey. The village is populated by Kurds of the Kurêşan tribe and had a population of 66 in 2021.

The hamlets of Çatılı, Durak, Erler, Geçimli, Geçit, Haydarlı and Sağ are attached to the village.

References 

Villages in Tunceli District
Kurdish settlements in Tunceli Province